Edward Hull   (21 May 1829 – 18 October 1917) was an Irish geologist and stratigrapher who held the position of Director of the Geological Survey of Ireland. He was also a professor of geology in the Royal College of Science, Dublin.  His dates are listed in the Oxford Dictionary of National Biography.

Biography
He was born in Antrim, Ireland, the eldest son of the Reverend J.D. Hull. He graduated B.A. from Trinity College, Dublin.

He joined the Geological Survey of Ireland and worked in Wales and on the Lancashire Coalfield. He worked for the Geological Survey of Scotland (1867-1868) and led an expedition to survey parts of Arabia Petraea and Palestine (1883). He became Director of the Irish branch of the Survey and retired in 1891. He was elected a Fellow of the Royal Society in June 1867. He was President of the Royal Geological Society of Ireland in 1873.

His daughter Charlotte Ferguson-Davie became a noted physician. He died at his home in Notting Hill, London, aged 88. Edward Hull's obituarist wrote of him, "He maintained the honour of a gentleman."

Works
 
 
 
  ; (revised, 2nd edition, 1891)

   ; This book has been updated in the late 20th century and 21st century.
 
   , 2nd edition, 1910
(review)

Family
Hull married in 1857 Mary Catherine Henrietta Cooke, daughter of Charles Turner Cooke, a surgeon in Cheltenham and his wife Catherine Bennett Cooke. They had a family of two sons and four daughters, who included Eleanor Hull and Charlotte Elizabeth Ferguson-Davie. Another daughter, Alice, married in 1896 John Hill Twigg (1841–1917) of the Indian Civil Service.

Notes

External links
 
 

1829 births
1917 deaths
People from Antrim, County Antrim
Irish geologists
Fellows of the Royal Society